The Story of Nick Price Non-Manipulative Selling is a short-lived live-action educational series produced in early 1980s by Walt Disney Educational. The series dealt with business of selling items.

1981
A Better Way to Go: An Introduction to Non-Manipulative Selling
The Danbury Secret of Flexible Behavior
The Voice: Questions That Help You Sell (February 1981) on the importance of communication with customers

References

American short documentary films
1981 films
1980s American films